Vascular Pharmacology is a peer-reviewed medical journal covering research on all aspects of biology and pharmacology of the vascular system. It was established in 1970 as Comparative and General Pharmacology and renamed to General Pharmacology: The Vascular System in 1975, before obtaining its current name in 2002. The journal is published by Elsevier and the editor-in-chief is Raffaele De Caterina (D'Annunzio University of Chieti–Pescara).

Abstracting and indexing 
The journal is abstracted and indexed in BIOSIS Previews, CAB Abstracts, Chemical Abstracts, Current Contents/Life Sciences, EMBASE, MEDLINE, Science Citation Index, and Scopus.

External links 
 

Elsevier academic journals
Pharmacology journals
English-language journals
Publications established in 1970
Monthly journals